Vallow is a surname. Notable people with the surname include:

Kara Vallow (born 1967), American television producer
 J. J. Vallow,  murdered child from Idaho, United States
Lori Vallow, mother of the murdered children  Tylee Ryan and J. J. Vallow
Scott Vallow (born 1977), American soccer player